Battletown is an unincorporated rural community in Meade County, Kentucky, United States.  It is a small unincorporated community that lies a few miles northwest of Brandenburg on KY 228, at its intersection with Pine Ridge Road.

Notable people

Rick Stansbury, college basketball coach, born in Battletown in 1959

References

Unincorporated communities in Meade County, Kentucky
Louisville metropolitan area
Unincorporated communities in Kentucky